Fu Yan (born 1903) was a Chinese politician. She was among the first group of women elected to the Legislative Yuan in 1948.

Biography
Fu attended Nankai University in Tianjin and graduated from the Department of Political Science at the National University of Peking. She went on to earn a master's degree in public administration at California State University. She subsequently taught at National Normal University, the Central Police College, National Lanzhou University and the Great China University.

She was a Kuomintang candidate in Henan province in the 1948 elections to the Legislative Yuan, in which she was elected to parliament. During the Chinese Civil War she relocated to Taiwan.

References

1903 births
Nankai University alumni
National University of Peking alumni
Academic staff of the Central Police University
Academic staff of Lanzhou University
Members of the Kuomintang
20th-century Chinese women politicians
Members of the 1st Legislative Yuan
Members of the 1st Legislative Yuan in Taiwan
Date of death unknown